Osyp Lebedowicz is an American Magic: The Gathering player. He won Pro Tour Venice 2003, and is also known for his involvement in developing the Aether Vial affinity archetype.

Achievements

References

American Magic: The Gathering players
Living people
Year of birth missing (living people)
People from Highland Park, New Jersey